The list of Phi Beta Sigma brothers (commonly referred to as Sigmas) includes initiated and honorary members. Members traditionally are initiated into a chapter, although some members are granted honorary membership status. A chapter name ending in "Sigma" denotes a graduate chapter. No chapter of Phi Beta Sigma is designated Omega, the last letter of the Greek alphabet that traditionally signifies "the end"; deceased brothers are referred to as having joined The Omega Chapter.

The fraternity has been led by 33 international presidents. Its membership includes four African presidents; two governors; three congressmen; the first black Rhodes Scholar; numerous NFL football, NBA basketball, and MLB baseball players; an ultimate fighter; five Hall of Fame athletes; ten college and university presidents; and sixteen Olympians. Various buildings and schools have been named after Sigma men such as George Washington Carver, James Weldon Johnson, and Robert Russa Moton.

Listed below are notable Phi Beta Sigma men such as the founders, international presidents, and members who are involved in the fields of arts and entertainment, business, civil rights, education, health, law, politics, science, and sports.

Founders 

A. Langston Taylor, Esq. (January 29, 1890 - August 8, 1953) was the first international president of Phi Beta Sigma. Taylor coined "Culture for Service, Service for Humanity". He began serving humanity by founding Sigma, to which he gave twelve consecutive years of service as a national officer, serving as national president, national treasurer, national secretary and field secretary. He also served as president of the Distinguished Service Chapter.

Dr. Leonard F. Morse (January 12, 1891 – May 22, 1961), co-founder of Phi Beta Sigma Fraternity, was a student of the Greek language, and he named the fraternity. In addition, he wrote Sigma's first constitution and was the first president of Alpha Chapter. He was the first person to graduate from Howard University in 3 years with two degrees (A.B and a B.Ed degree).

Charles I. Brown (August 27, 1890 – December 21, 1981), co-founder of Phi Beta Sigma Fraternity; first vice-president of Phi Beta Sigma. He is credited with choosing the nine charter members of Phi Beta Sigma Fraternity. Founder Brown founded the Delta Chapter of Phi Beta Sigma at Kansas State University in Manhattan, Kansas, on April 9, 1917, and was a teacher at the Kansas Industrial School for Negroes in Topeka, Kansas.

International presidents
Listed below are the thirty-four international presidents since the 1914 institution of the office.

 Abram Langston Taylor, Esq. 1914–1916
 Ivorite L. Scruggs, M.D. 1917–1919
 William S. Savage, 1920–1921
 Walter M. Clarke, 1921–1922
 John W. Woodhous, 1923–1925
 Arthur W. Mitchell, Esq. 1926–1934
 Jesse W. Lewis, 1935–1936
 James W. Johnson, 1937
 George W. Lawrence, 1938–1940
 Richard A. Billings, 1941–1944
 George A. Parker, 1944–1947
 Ras O. Johnson, 1948–1950
 Felix J. Brown, 1951–1953
 George L. Hightower, 1954–1955
 George D. Flemmings; 1955–1957
 Hutson L. Lovell, 1958–1959
 Roswell O. Sutton, 1960–1962
 Maurice A. Moore, 1963-1965
 Alvin J. McNeil, 1966–1970
 Parlette L. Moore, Ed.D. 1971–1973
 John E. Westberry, 1974–1976
 Richard M. Ballard, Jr., 1977–1979
 Charles B. Wright, 1980–1981
 Demetrius Newton, Esq. 1981–1984
 James T. Floyd 1984–1987
 Moses C. McClendon, 1987–1989
 Carter D. Womack, 1989–1993
 William E. Stanley, Jr., 1993–1995
 Carter D. Womack, 1995–1997
 Peter M. Adams, Esq. 1997–2001
 Arthur R. Thomas, Esq. 2001–2005
 Paul L. Griffin, Jr., 2005–2009
 Jimmy Hammock, 2009–2013
 Jonathan Mason, 2013-2017
 Micheal E. Cristal, 2017-2021
 Chris V. Rey, J.D., 2021–Present

Science, education and medicine

Civic leaders, politicians and activists

Heads of state

United States Congressmen

Military leaders

State legislators

Mayors

Judges

Activists and other leaders

Business

Entertainment

Sports

American football

Baseball

Basketball

Track and field

Other sports

References

Lists of members of United States student societies
Brothers